A ''unit process'' is one or more grouped operations in a manufacturing system that can be defined and separated from others. 

In life-cycle assessment (LCA) and ISO 14040, a unit process is defined as "smallest element considered in the life cycle inventory analysis for which input and output data are quantified".

See also 
 Unit operation

References